The Kökömeren is a right tributary of the Naryn located in Chüy Region (Jayyl District) and Naryn Region (Jumgal District) of Kyrgyzstan. It is formed by the confluence of the rivers Suusamyr and Batysh Karakol (Western Karakol). It possesses significant hydro-power potential. In June 2011, China and Kyrgyzstan signed a protocol of intent to begin construction of Kökömeren River chain of power plants in 2012. Whitewater rafting and fishing are popular tourist activities on the Kökömeren.

References

Rivers of Kyrgyzstan